Martin Reeves (born 7 September 1981) is an English former football midfielder who last played for Brackley Town.

References

Since 1888... The Searchable Premiership and Football League Player Database (subscription required)
Sporting-heroes.net
Profile

1981 births
Living people
English footballers
Association football midfielders
Premier League players
Leicester City F.C. players
Hull City A.F.C. players
Northampton Town F.C. players
Aldershot Town F.C. players
Nuneaton Borough F.C. players
Hucknall Town F.C. players
Brackley Town F.C. players